Poncione di Ganna is a mountain of Lombardy, Italy. It has an elevation of 993 metres above sea level. It is part of the Varese Prealps subgroup of the Lugano Prealps.

Mountains of the Alps
Mountains of Lombardy
Lugano Prealps